Membe is an administrative ward in the Chamwino District of the Dodoma Region of Tanzania. In 2016 the Tanzania National Bureau of Statistics report there were 9,484 people in the ward.

References

Wards of Dodoma Region